Paracroton pendulus is a species of flowering plant in the family Euphorbiaceae that is endemic to Western Ghats of India and Sri Lanka.

Description
Leaves - simple, alternate; lamina elliptic to oblanceolate; apex acuminate; margin serrate.
Flowers - unisexual flowers are dioecious. inflorescence is panicled pendulous racemes.
Fruits - globose brownish tomentose capsule.
Uses - timber, medicine. red sap is known to have irritating ability.

References

Crotoneae
Flora of tropical Asia
Taxa named by Friedrich Anton Wilhelm Miquel
Dioecious plants